The Übelsberg is a 651.3 metre high mountain in the South Harz, which lies southwest of Sieber in the district of Göttingen in Lower Saxony. It sits astride the watershed between the Grade Lutter and the Krumme Lutter rivers. The mountain is linked via a ridge to the Aschentalshalbe in the north and the Mittelberg in the south.

Sources 
 Topographische Karte 1:25000, Nr. 4328 Bad Lauterberg im Harz

Mountains of the Harz
Mountains of Lower Saxony
Mountains under 1000 metres
Göttingen (district)